Luke Robert Babbitt (born June 20, 1989) is an American former professional basketball player. He played college basketball for the Nevada Wolf Pack before declaring for the 2010 NBA draft following his sophomore year. He was selected by the Minnesota Timberwolves with the 16th overall pick in the 2010 NBA draft, then traded to the Portland Trail Blazers.

Early life
Babbitt was born in Cincinnati, Ohio. At the age of nine his family moved to Reno, Nevada. Babbitt attended Galena High School, where he was a 3-time All-State performer and a two-time Gatorade State Player of the Year in basketball. As a junior, Babbitt averaged 27.8 points and 9.5 rebounds per game while leading Galena to a state championship. Babbitt finished his high school career by scoring 2,941 points, which broke future college teammate Armon Johnson's Nevada state scoring record of 2,616 points.

Considered a four-star recruit by Rivals.com, Babbitt was listed as the No. 12 power forward and the No. 31 player in the nation in 2008.

College career
After originally verbally committing to Ohio State, Babbitt backed out and decided to attend the University of Nevada. In his first game, Babbitt recorded a 20-point, 12-rebound double-double versus Montana State. He went on to average 16.9 points per game during his freshman year including a season-high 30 points on March 12, 2009 versus San Jose State.

In his sophomore season, Babbitt led the team in scoring with 21.9 points per game. He scored a career-high 33 points in the Western Athletic Conference tournament semifinals on March 13, 2010 versus New Mexico State. Despite losing that game and ending their hopes of going to the NCAA Tournament, Nevada was invited to the NIT, where they lost in the second round to the University of Rhode Island.

On April 20, 2010, Babbitt hired an agent and declared for the NBA draft.

Professional career

Portland Trail Blazers (2010–2013)
Babbitt was selected with the 16th overall pick by the Minnesota Timberwolves in the 2010 NBA draft. His rights were later traded, along with Wolves forward Ryan Gomes, to the Portland Trail Blazers in exchange for Martell Webster. On July 9, 2010, Babbitt signed his rookie contract with the Blazers. He then joined the Blazers for the 2010 NBA Summer League.

On December 8, 2010, Babbitt was assigned to the Idaho Stampede of the NBA D-League. On December 18, 2010, he was recalled by the Trail Blazers. On March 3, 2011, he was reassigned to the Idaho Stampede. On March 28, 2011, he was recalled by the Trail Blazers. On January 4, 2012, he was reassigned to the Idaho Stampede. On January 10, 2012, he was recalled again.

Babbitt joined the Trail Blazers for the 2012 NBA Summer League.

Nizhny Novgorod (2013–2014)
In August 2013, Babbitt signed with Nizhny Novgorod of Russia for the 2013–14 season. In January 2014, he left Russia under controversial circumstances.

New Orleans Pelicans (2014–2016)
On February 4, 2014, Babbitt signed with the New Orleans Pelicans. On July 20, 2015, he re-signed with the Pelicans.

Miami Heat (2016–2017)
On July 10, 2016, Babbitt was traded to the Miami Heat in exchange for a 2018 second-round draft pick and cash considerations.

Atlanta Hawks (2017–2018) 
Babbitt signed with the Atlanta Hawks on August 9, 2017.

Return to Miami (2018) 
Babbitt was traded back to the Heat on February 8, 2018 in exchange for Okaro White.

Career statistics

NBA

Regular season

|-
| style="text-align:left;"| 
| style="text-align:left;"| Portland
| 24 || 0 || 5.7 || .273 || .188 || .333 || 1.3 || .3 || .1 || .1 || 1.5
|-
| style="text-align:left;"| 
| style="text-align:left;"| Portland
| 40 || 4 || 13.4 || .410 || .430 || .850 || 2.4 || .4 || .3 || .1 || 5.1
|-
| style="text-align:left;"| 
| style="text-align:left;"| Portland
| 62 || 0 || 11.8 || .368 || .348 || .769 || 2.2 || .5 || .2 || .1 || 3.9
|-
| style="text-align:left;"| 
| style="text-align:left;"| New Orleans
| 27 || 2 || 17.5 || .390 || .379 || .778 || 3.3 || 1.1 || .3 || .4 || 6.3
|-
| style="text-align:left;"| 
| style="text-align:left;"| New Orleans
| 63 || 19 || 13.2 || .479 || .513 || .684 || 1.8 || .4 || .3 || .2 || 4.1
|-
| style="text-align:left;"| 
| style="text-align:left;"| New Orleans
| 47 || 13 || 18.0 || .422 || .404 || .780 || 3.1 || 1.1 || .2 || .1 || 7.0
|-
| style="text-align:left;"| 
| style="text-align:left;"| Miami
|  68  ||  55  || 15.7 || .402 || .414 || .733 || 2.1 || .5 || .3 || .2 || 4.8
|-
| style="text-align:left;"| 
| style="text-align:left;"| Atlanta
| 37 || 9 || 15.4 || .476 || .441 || .773 || 2.2 || .7 || .2 || .1 || 6.1
|-
| style="text-align:left;"| 
| style="text-align:left;"| Miami
| 13 || 5 || 11.2 || .234 || .244 || .000 || 1.2 || .4 || .1 || .2 || 2.5
|- class="sortbottom"
| style="text-align:center;" colspan="2"| Career
| 381 || 107 || 14.0 || .408 || .402 || .747 || 2.2 || .6 || .2 || .2 || 4.8

Playoffs

|-
| style="text-align:left;"| 2018
| style="text-align:left;"| Miami
| 2 || 0 || 1.5 || .000 || – || – || .0 || .0 || .0 || .0 || .0
|- class="sortbottom"
| style="text-align:center;" colspan="2"| Career
| 2 || 0 || 1.5 || .000 || – || – || .0 || .0 || .0 || .0 || .0

College

|-
| style="text-align:left;"| 2008–09
| style="text-align:left;"| Nevada
| 34 || 34 || 32.6 || .456 || .429 || .864 || 7.4 || 1.4 || .7 || .7 || 16.9
|-
| style="text-align:left;"| 2009–10
| style="text-align:left;"| Nevada
| 34 || 34 || 37.1 || .500 || .416 || .917 || 8.9 || 2.1 || 1.0 || .8 || 21.9
|- class="sortbottom"
| style="text-align:center;" colspan="2"| Career
| 68 || 68 || 34.9 || .480 || .421 || .893 || 8.1 || 1.8 || .9 || .8 || 19.4

Awards and recognition
 2008–09 WAC Freshman of the Year
 2008–09 WAC 1st Team All- Conference
 2008–09 WAC Newcomer of the Year
 2009–10 WAC All-Decade Team
 2009–10 ESPN The Magazine Academic All-American
 2009–10 AP All American Honorable Mention
 2009–10 Naismith Award mid-season finalist
 2009–10 WAC Player of the Year
 2009–10 WAC 1st Team All- Conference
 2008–2010 2× WAC All-Tournament Team

References

External links

 Luke Babbitt at nevadawolfpack.com

1989 births
Living people
American expatriate basketball people in Russia
American men's basketball players
Atlanta Hawks players
Basketball players from Nevada
Basketball players from Cincinnati
BC Nizhny Novgorod players
High school basketball coaches in Nevada
Idaho Stampede players
McDonald's High School All-Americans
Miami Heat players
Minnesota Timberwolves draft picks
Nevada Wolf Pack men's basketball players
New Orleans Pelicans players
Parade High School All-Americans (boys' basketball)
Portland Trail Blazers players
Small forwards
Sportspeople from Reno, Nevada